Wushu at the Universiade has only been contested once in 2017 as an optional sport. In 2021, it will return with the same status.

Editions

Medal table

 
Sports at the Summer Universiade
Universiade